Darkroom Familia is a Norteno gang with artists from various parts of Northern California. They were originally formed in 1988. Like other burgeoning gangster rappers of the era, major labels weren't quick to sign such bands, so the band members had to sell their tapes by taking them personally to record stores in the area as word of mouth quickly began to spread. Darkroom Familia became one of rap's most prolific bands, issuing albums (whether it be by the band or solo releases by its members) at an extremely brisk rate.  They also released one of the first all Spanish rap albums Los Traficantes - Matan Mi Gente.

Albums

Temporary Insanity - Bitchez Never Learn, 1993
From The Barrio With Love, 1994
Playerz 4 Life - Major Game, 1995
Temporary Insanity - Woke Up Hatin' Tha World, 1995
Barrio Love, 1996
Los Traficantes - Matan Mi Gente, 1998
Gang Stories - The Darkroom Uncensored, 1998
Apocalypse Brown, 1998
Los Traficantes - No Pararemos Hasta La Muerte, 1999
From The Barrio With Love, 1999 (re-release)
Return Of The Living Vets, 1999
Connected - Felony Consequences, 1999
Homicide Kings, 2000
Men Of Honor, 2001
Family Reunion, 2005
Northern Cali Finest, 2006
Last Vets standing, 2007
Connectionz, 2008
Los Traficantes - Conecta Del Norte, 2008
From The Barrio With Hate, 2009
Norcal Narcotics, 2010

Solo albums

Sir Dyno
Duke
Crooked
D-Roll
K.I.D.
Oso
Young D
Dub
A.L.G.
Mr. Menti
Emaculate aka E-Mac

References
http://www.brownpowerrecords.com/

Chicano rap
Musical groups established in 1988
Gangsta rap groups
1988 establishments in California